100 Women in Finance, formerly 100 Women in Hedge Funds (100WHF), is a non-profit organization for professionals who work in the alternative investment and broader finance industry. The organization aims to strengthen women's presence in the finance field by supporting women at each career stage to achieve their career goals.  Actual membership comprises more than 15,000 professionals in 22 locations. Professional members advocate for a new generation of leadership, where women and men are equally successful and impactful in their roles as investment professionals and executives.

History
Sarah Dyer, Dana Hall, and Carol Kim were hedge fund managers who initiated an innovative idea of gathering one hundred senior women investment professionals to build professional relationships where they could enhance their communication and share their ideas and experiences in the alternatives industry. The idea bore fruition when they founded 100 Women in Finance in December 2001 and launched its inaugural event 100 Women in Hedge Funds in New York to educate professionals in the industry about this organization’s goals. As the organization grew in the ensuring months, three areas were identified where collaboration could be made to impact the industry and beyond: Peer Engagement, Philanthropy, and Education.

The organization has hosted more than 600 education events globally. Its philanthropic mission focuses on three areas: mentoring, women's and family health, and education. The organization has raised over $40 million gross for various charities.

The organization has been a vanguard in working for a world in which women get an equal opportunity in the highly competitive world of Hedge Funds.  The organization frequently holds events for its members to gain insight from other accomplished participants in the field, such as the June 2012 event in New York City, “Up Close and Personal with Eileen Murray,” featuring the CEO of Bridgewater Associates.

In 2010, Prince William of Wales became the Patron of 100 Women in Hedge Funds. In late 2012, it was announced that William, by then Duke of Cambridge; his wife Catherine (then Duchess of Cambridge); and his brother Prince Harry would all be Patrons of 100WHF's Philanthropic Initiatives beginning in January 2013.

In December 2012, Ivanka Trump, Executive Vice President for Development and Acquisitions for The Trump Organization, was announced as one of four new board directors, highlighting what Mimi Drake, president of Permit Capital Advisors and global chair of the 100WHF Association Board, referred to as the organization's "deepening of [its] senior practitioner base to include family office leadership, private equity investors, real estate investing and women on corporate boards."

What began as a simple notion grew into a powerful mission that reverberated through the industry. Professionals from various segments of the industry – from hedge funds to alternative investments – became members. Staffed by more than 500 active volunteers in 28 locations, the model of the non-profit was that the organization’s activities would be member- and practitioner-driven. To date, it has organized more than 1,000 educational events. Further, through funding initiatives, the non-profit’s network of professionals raised more than $55 million gross to support other non-profit organizations whose mission goals were also aligned with 100 Women in Finance. The organization has become the network for connecting women, knowledge, and resources so each woman can find her own path to success.

Annual Gala Dinner
Every year, 100 Women in Finance holds Gala fundraising events worldwide at which they honor a woman who has played a leading role in the Alternatives or broader Financial industry, as well as someone who has made a difference in the world of philanthropy.

Past industry leadership awards have gone to: Geraldine Sundstrom (London, 2010), Dorothy Weaver(New York, 2010), and Sonia Gardner (London, 2008).
Past effecting change awards have gone to:  T. Boone Pickens (2010), Joel Klein (2009), Ken Langone (2008), Julian Robertson (2007) and Carl Icahn (2006).

Cayman Gala 
On Friday, May 6, 2022, 100 Women in Finance (100 WF) will be hosting its Eighth Annual Barefoot Beach Fundraising Gala at the Kimpton Seafire Resort and Spa Beach Deck. The profits generated from this fundraising will support 100WF’s Investing in the Next Generation Initiatives that provide a variety of services for women in the 13-25 age group, such as career development, scholarships, and mentorship.

During the last ten years, 100WF has fundraised more than $300,000 for various non-profit organizations in the area, including Big Brothers Big Sisters, Breast Cancer Foundation, Cayman Islands Crisis Centre, Inclusion Cayman, Literacy Is For Everyone and GirlForce 100. GirlForce 100 is a mentorship program for young female students who have proven to possess the ambition, commitment, drive, and potential to be successful academically and professionally, also benefited from these funds. GirlForce 100 creates mentor-mentee relationships whereby mentees are guided in chartering their paths towards future successful careers.

New York Gala
The New York Gala, which was held by 100WF on November 15, 2019, revealed that its fundraising resulted in gross proceeds that exceeded $1.1M USD to support its investing in the Next Generation Initiative.

London Gala 
At the London Gala which was held on April 7, 2022, the 100WF organization reported that its fundraising netted gross proceeds which exceeded £400K to benefit its Investing in the Next Generation Initiative. The event was attended by almost three hundred industry professionals. The Group Treasurer, UK Chief Executive & Chief Transformation Officer of UBS Group AG, Beatriz Martin, was acknowledged for her leadership and achievements in the financial services industry via 100WF’s EMEA Industry Leadership Award. This award is given away every year to a female leader in the financial services industry, one who has demonstrated exceptional career talent, ethical leadership, and possesses dedication for investing, attributes that would help drive and enhance the standards of excellence of the industry.

Hong Kong Gala 
100WF held the 7th Annual Hong Kong Gala on October 22, 2019, where the organization declared that its fundraising resulted in gross proceeds of HKD 4.4M to benefit its Investing in the Next Generation Initiative. These proceeds will support partner organizations in Hong Kong, including the Hong Kong Award for Young People, and the Women’s Foundation of Hong Kong, through funding student programs that align with the Next Generation initiative’s vision.

Toronto Gala 
on November 18, 2019, Toronto Gala announced that its fundraising resulted in gross proceeds that exceeded CAD 80K to benefit its Investing in the Next Generation Initiative.

Partnerships

1. Black Hedge Fund Professionals Network (BHFPN) 
100 Women in Finance established a partnership with Black Hedge Fund Professionals Network (BHFPN), a New York based non-profit organization, in February 2021. The mission of BHFPN, which was launched in 2019, is aligned with100WHF in that it seeks to enhance the hedge fund professional careers of members of the black and brown communities. This was the second time in recent months that 100WF has partnered with another organization to help promote the professional careers of people of color, by supporting those who are just starting out their careers in the finance industry, through membership and reciprocal support, speaker referrals, and co-programming.

2. The United Nations Capital Development Fund (UNCDF) 

100 Women in Finance partners with the United Nations Capital Development Fund (UNCDF) in April 2021. Again, similar to 100WF’s mission, UNCDF seeks to support and advance the careers of women in the finance industry in Africa, by providing mentorship, networking, and access to leadership resources. The UNCDF-100WF partnership will empower women across Africa who are either already finance professionals or  interested in pursuing careers in the finance industry.

Top Stories 
100 Women in Finance organization has been operating for twenty years and will celebrate this milestone with activities that show their appreciation for those volunteer members who helped to develop it into the foremost organization committed to advancing the visibility and position of women within the finance industry worldwide. When it was first established in 2001, the 100 Women in Finance created its three pillars which are: Education, Impact, and Peer Engagement which provide the organization with a mission imbued with achievement, confidence, and purpose that will serve to propel its growth in the next two decades so as to reach its Vision 30/40 goals. Their mission is to create a finance industry that is more diverse and equitable to both men and women. This, according to the organization’s CEO, Amanda Pullinger, is only the start of the organization's  efforts towards achieving their industry goal, which is Vision 30/40, where thirty percent of senior investment and committee executives will be women by the year 2040. Reaching this goal requires the organization to promote their membership and encourage the visibility of women employees in the finance industry, encourage diverse perspectives, and support the infusion of new blood into industry leadership.

News 
The "100 Women in Hedge Funds/CAIA Scholars" program is offered annually to up to 10 individuals who have an interest in pursuing a career in alternative investment management, with a specific focus on portfolio management. This scholarship initiative, offered by the 100 Women in Hedge Funds Institute through the sponsorship of Pacific Alternative Asset Management Company, LLC (PAAMCO), was established to attract and reward rising female talent in the alternative investment field.

In June 2012, The Chartered Alternative Investment Analyst (CAIA) Foundation announced receipt of the CAIA Charter by the first two members of the inaugural class of  the 100 Women in Hedge Funds/CAIA Scholars program.

100 Women in Finance has also created a mentor-mentee program called "LaunchMe". In this program, the member becomes a mentee and is connected with one of 100WF’s global members, an individual who is employed full-time in the finance industry, who then becomes the mentor. The mentor will share her views on diverse careers within the finance industry and advise the mentee on how to grow her professional network. Furthermore, the mentee will also be added to an exclusive list of candidates who would be considered qualified for potential employment in summer and full-time positions within the industry. The mentor will serve as a positive role model to coach the mentees on career skills development and planning and provide them with resources about industry insights, using her own experience and perspectives as a guiding force. This program will also conduct webinars where industry mentors become the advocates for member mentees by sharing their insights on leadership and self-development.

100 Women in Finance is supporting Ukrainian women who fled Ukraine due to Russia Invasion. The organization is giving a one year complimentary membership to Ukrainian women, which may include female college students, to support their efforts to obtain guidance or secure employment in the finance industry.

References

Hedge funds
Women's organizations based in the United States
Finance in the United States
Organizations established in 2001
2001 establishments in the United States
Women in finance